Marienthal is a village in the commune of Tuntange, in western Luxembourg.  , the village has a population of 105. It is known for the former monastery Marienthal, of which a few buildings remain.

Mersch (canton)
Villages in Luxembourg